Alexander Allardyce (1743–1801) was a member of the Parliament of Great Britain and later the British Parliament for the Aberdeen Burghs from 18 May 1792 to 1 November 1801.
He came from an old Kincardineshire family.

Early life
Allardyce was born in Aberdeen. As a young man, he traveled to Jamaica and became wealthy in the slave trade, as well as fathering an illegitimate daughter with Elizabeth Delpratt of Kingston, Jamaica. At his return to Scotland in 1780 he purchased an estate in Kincardineshire.

His second daughter Eleanor Allardyce would go onto marry Archibald Kennedy, Earl of Cassilis.

Career as member of the British Parliament
Allardyce first entered Parliament in 1792 with the backing of Henry Dundas, after the death of the Aberdeen sitting member. He would retain the seat unchallenged in 1796.

He spoke in favor of the Aberdeen Police Bill of 28 April 1794, and protested strongly against provisions of a Post Office Duty Bill on 21 February and 4 March 1801.

Death
Alllardyce died in office on 1 November 1801. He was buried at St Nicholas Kirkyard, in Aberdeen.

References

1743 births
1801 deaths
Members of the Parliament of Great Britain for Scottish constituencies
Members of the Parliament of the United Kingdom for Aberdeen constituencies
British MPs 1790–1796
British MPs 1796–1800
UK MPs 1801–1802
Scottish slave traders
Politicians from Aberdeen